Make It Right may refer to:

 Make It Right (album), a 2012 album by American rock band Abel
 "Make It Right" (BTS song), a 2019 song by South Korean boy band BTS
 "Make It Right" (Christian Falk song), a 1999 song by Swedish producer Christian Falk
 "Make It Right" (Lisa Stansfield song), a 1994 song by British singer Lisa Stansfield
 Make It Right (Thai series), 2016-2017
 Make It Right Foundation, a non-profit foundation founded by Brad Pitt